A Mother's Love is a 1929 German silent drama film directed by Georg Jacoby and starring Henny Porten, Gustav Diessl, and Paul Henckels. It was shot at the Staaken Studios in Berlin and on location in Pomerania. The film's sets were designed by Gustav A. Knauer and Willy Schiller.

Cast

References

External links

Films of the Weimar Republic
German silent feature films
Films directed by Georg Jacoby
1929 drama films
German drama films
German black-and-white films
Silent drama films
Films shot at Staaken Studios
1920s German films
1920s German-language films